Slatina (meaning approximately "marsh, swamp, watery plain" or "salty water" in Slavic languages and in Romanian) may refer to:

Antarctica
Slatina Peak

Bosnia and Herzegovina
Slatina, Donji Vakuf, a village in Donji Vakuf Municipality
Slatina, Foča, a village in Foča Municipality
Slatina, Jablanica, a village in Jablanica Municipality
Slatina, Laktaši, a spa resort in Laktaši Municipality
Srednja Slatina, a village in Šamac Municipality

Bulgaria
Byala Slatina, a town in Vratsa Province
Slatina, Sofia, a district of Sofia
Slatina, Lovech Province, a village in Lovech Municipality
Slatina, Montana Province, a village in Berkovitsa Municipality
Slatina, Plovdiv Province, a village in Karlovo Municipality
Slatina, a village in Sitovo Municipality

Croatia
 Slatina, Croatia, a town in the Virovitica-Podravina County
 Kutinska Slatina, a village in the Sisak-Moslavina County
 Moslavačka Slatina, a village in the Sisak-Moslavina County
 Petrova Slatina, a village in the Osijek-Baranja County
 Slatina Pokupska, a village in the Sisak-Moslavina County
 Slatina Svedruška, a village in the Krapina-Zagorje County

Czech Republic
Slatina (Kladno District), a municipality and village in the Central Bohemian Region
Slatina (Klatovy District), a municipality and village in the Plzeň Region
Slatina (Litoměřice District), a municipality and village in the Ústí nad Labem Region
Slatina (Nový Jičín District), a municipality and village in the Moravian-Silesian Region
Slatina (Plzeň-North District), a municipality and village in the Plzeň Region
Slatina (Svitavy District), a municipality and village in the Pardubice Region
Slatina (Ústí nad Orlicí District), a municipality and village in the Pardubice Region
Slatina (Znojmo District), a municipality and village in the South Moravian Region
Slatina nad Úpou, a municipality and village in the Hradec Králové Region
Slatina nad Zdobnicí, a municipality and village in the Hradec Králové Region
Horní Slatina, a municipality and village in the South Bohemian Region
Brno-Slatina, a district of Brno
Slatina, a village and part of Chudenice
Slatina, a village and part of Františkovy Lázně
Slatina, a village and part of Horní Vltavice
Slatina, a village and part of Hostouň
Slatina, a part of Hradec Králové

Montenegro
Slatina, Andrijevica, a village in Andrijevica Municipality
Slatina, Pljevlja, a village in Pljevlja Municipality
Slatina, a village in Danilovgrad Municipality
Slatina, a village in Šavnik Municipality

Romania
Slatina, Romania, the capital city of Olt County
FC Olt Slatina, a defunct association football club
CSM Slatina (football), an association football club
CSM Slatina (women's handball), a club
Slatina, Suceava, a commune in Suceava County
Slatina, a village in Nucșoara Commune, Argeș County
Slatina-Nera, a village in Sasca Montană Commune, Caraș-Severin County
Slatina-Timiș, a commune in Caraș-Severin County
Slatina de Criș, a village in Dezna Commune, Arad County
Slatina de Mureș, a village in Bârzava, Arad

Watercourses
Slatina, a tributary of the river Sebeș in Caraș-Severin County
Slatina, a tributary of the river Bresnic in Caraș-Severin County
Slatina, a tributary of the river Putna in Vrancea County
Slatina, a tributary of the river Trebeș in Bacău County
Slatina, a tributary of the river Iza in Maramureș County
Slatina, a tributary of the river Arieșul Mic in Alba County
Slatina, a tributary of the river Râul Doamnei in Argeș County
Slatina (Timiș), a tributary of the river Timiș in Caraș-Severin County
Slatina, a smaller tributary of the river Timiș in Timiș County
Slatina (Apa Mare), a tributary of the river Apa Mare in Arad and Timiș Counties

Serbia
Slatina (Čačak), a village in Moravica District
Slatina (Knjaževac), a village in Zaječar District
Slatina (Loznica), a village in Mačva District
Slatina (Negotin), a village in Bor District
Slatina (Šabac), a village in Mačva District

Slovakia
Slatina, Levice District, a municipality and village in the Nitra Region
Slatina nad Bebravou, a municipality and village in the Trenčín Region
Slatina (Slovakia), a tributary of the river Hron
Slatina, a village and administrative part of Dohňany
Slatina, a village and administrative part of Lúky

Slovenia
Municipality of Rogaška Slatina, a municipality in the Styria Region
Rogaška Slatina, a town in the municipality
Slatina pri Ponikvi, a settlement in the Municipality of Šentjur

Ukraine
Solotvyno, also known in Romanian as Slatina

See also
Donja Slatina (disambiguation)
Gornja Slatina (disambiguation)
Slatine
Slatino